Štiavnička is a village and municipality in Ružomberok District in the Žilina Region of northern Slovakia.

History
In historical records the village was first mentioned in 1505.

Geography
The municipality lies at an altitude of 497 metres and covers an area of 1.914 km². It has a population of about 564 people.

External links
http://www.statistics.sk/mosmis/eng/run.html

Villages and municipalities in Ružomberok District